Ealdred was a medieval Bishop of Leicester.

Ealdred was consecrated between 839 and December 840. He died between December 840 and 844.

Citations

References

External links
 

Bishops of Leicester (ancient)
9th-century English bishops